Chesalles may refer to:

Chesalles-sur-Moudon, Vaud, Switzerland
Chesalles-sur-Oron, Vaud, Switzerland